Ángel Marcos (born April 7, 1943) is an Argentine former football striker currently working in the staff of Niort.

Playing career
Marcos started his professional playing career in 1963 with Ferro Carril Oeste. He was part of the squad that won promotion to the Argentine Primera by winning the Primera B championship in 1963.

After a short spell with Nueva Chicago in 1966 Marcos joined Chacarita Juniors in 1967.

In the 1969 Metropolitano he was the captain and top scorer helping the team to win their only Argentine championship.

In 1971 Marcos joined Nantes and was part of the team that won the 1972-73 championship. He spent the last years of his playing career with Toulouse.

Managerial career
He has managed several clubs in France after his playing career, including Toulouse, Niort, Lorient and Nantes. He has also coached in U.A.E and Egypt.

Honours

References

External links
 Profile
Cómo olvidarte... Ángel Marcos (con nuevas imágenes)

1943 births
Living people
Footballers from Buenos Aires
Argentine footballers
Argentina international footballers
Argentine expatriate footballers
Association football forwards
Ferro Carril Oeste footballers
Nueva Chicago footballers
Chacarita Juniors footballers
FC Nantes players
Toulouse FC players
Expatriate footballers in France
Argentine expatriate sportspeople in France
Ligue 1 players
Ligue 2 players
Argentine football managers
Toulouse FC managers
Chamois Niortais F.C. managers
FC Lorient managers
FC Nantes managers
Expatriate football managers in France
Ligue 1 managers